The Airman Battle System Ground uniform (ABSGU), is a utility uniform for the United States Air Force. It was made to be issued to combat airmen instead of the Airman Battle Uniform because the ABU lacks flame resistance. As of now, the Air Force currently issues MultiCam pattern uniforms to combat airmen being deployed to the Middle East.

United States Air Force uniforms